Beach Festival World Championship 1997 is a beach volleyball arcade game released by South Korean company Comad in 1997. It features international teams of women and men volleyball players contesting the "World Beach Ball Championships".

1997 video games
Arcade video games
Arcade-only video games
Beach volleyball video games
Video games developed in South Korea
Video games set in 1997